Miguel Angel Cardona (born July 11, 1975) is an American educator and is currently serving as the 12th United States Secretary of Education under President Joe Biden since 2021. A member of the Democratic Party, he was confirmed by the U.S. Senate by a vote of 64–33 on March 1, 2021. Cardona previously served as commissioner of the Connecticut State Department of Education from 2019 to 2021.

A native of Meriden, Connecticut, Cardona began his career as a fourth-grade teacher at Israel Putnam Elementary School in Meriden. In 2003, at the age of 27, he was named principal of Meriden's Hanover School, making him the youngest principal in the state.

Early life and education 
Cardona was born on July 11, 1975, in Meriden, Connecticut, to Puerto Rican parents. Cardona grew up speaking Spanish as his first language and struggled to learn English when starting kindergarten. He was raised in a housing project in Meriden and graduated from the H.C. Wilcox Technical High School, where he was a part of the automotive studies program. Cardona earned a Bachelor of Science degree in education from Central Connecticut State University in 1997. He obtained a Master of Science in bilingual and bicultural education at University of Connecticut (UConn) in 2001. In 2004, he completed a professional sixth year certification at UConn where he earned a Doctor of Education in 2011. Cardona's dissertation, entitled Sharpening the Focus of Political Will to Address Achievement Disparities, studied the gaps between English-language learners and their classmates. His doctoral major advisor was Barry G. Sheckley and his associate advisor was Casey D. Cobb.

Career 
Cardona began his career as a fourth-grade teacher at Israel Putnam Elementary School in Meriden, Connecticut. In 2003, at Hanover Elementary School, he was promoted and made the youngest principal in the state's history for ten years. From 2015 to 2019, Cardona served as Assistant Superintendent for Teaching and Learning in his home town. Cardona was also an adjunct professor of education in the University of Connecticut's Department of Educational Leadership. During his career, he has focused on closing gaps between English-language learners and their peers.

In August 2019, Governor Ned Lamont appointed Cardona as Commissioner of Education; Cardona was the first Latino to hold the position.

Secretary of Education 
In December 2020, Cardona emerged as a candidate for United States Secretary of Education in Joe Biden's cabinet. Biden began to lean toward Cardona over two other "high-profile" teachers' union leaders, Lily Eskelsen García and Randi Weingarten. By choosing Cardona over the two, Biden "appeared to have sidestepped any sibling rivalry between the NEA and AFT".

Cardona was brought to the attention of Biden by Linda Darling-Hammond, the leader of the transition's Education Secretary search efforts, a role she also filled for Barack Obama in 2008. Darling-Hammond and Cardona had worked together on numerous projects. Politico noted that "Hispanic lawmakers are stressing in particular the need for a Latina to join the administration."

Cardona appeared before the Senate Committee on Health, Education, Labor and Pensions on February 3, 2021. On February 25, his nomination was advanced by the Senate on a cloture vote of 66–32. Cardona was confirmed on March 1, 2021 by a 64–33 vote.
Cardona took his oath of office on March 1, 2021 and was ceremonially sworn in by Vice President Kamala Harris on March 2, 2021.

In 2021, Cardona solicited a letter from the National School Boards Association to the U.S. Department of Justice asking for federal assistance with what the letter called a "growing number of threats of violence and acts of intimidation." The letter cited examples in several states and listed federal statutes under which assistance could be provided, including "the PATRIOT Act in regards to domestic terrorism." Several Republican elected officials criticized the letter's reference to domestic terrorism and called for Cardona to resign.

Personal life 

In 2002, Cardona married Marissa Pérez, a family-school liaison.  Pérez was named Miss Connecticut in 2001 and Miss Connecticut Teen USA in 1996.  Cardona and his wife have two children: a son, Miguel, Jr., and a daughter, Celine. Cardona is Catholic.

References

External links 

 Biography at the United States Department of Education

|-

|-

|-

1975 births
21st-century American educators
American politicians of Puerto Rican descent
Biden administration cabinet members
Central Connecticut State University alumni
Connecticut State Board of Education members
Hispanic and Latino American members of the Cabinet of the United States
Hispanic and Latino American teachers
Living people
People from Meriden, Connecticut
Schoolteachers from Connecticut
State cabinet secretaries of Connecticut
United States Secretaries of Education
University of Connecticut alumni
Puerto Rican Catholics
Biden administration personnel